The National Institute of Genetics ("Japanese Institute of Genetics") is a Japanese institution founded in 1949.

It hosts the DNA Data Bank of Japan.

Notes and references

External links
 

Genetic engineering in Japan
Genomics
Bioinformatics organizations
Biological databases
Medical research institutes in Japan
Research institutes established in 1949
1949 establishments in Japan